Sydney Metro is the brand name for rapid transit service in Sydney, New South Wales. The first section of the network, the North West line, opened in 2019. The City & Southwest extension to this line is under construction, with the Western and Western Sydney Airport lines are in the planning stage.



Current

Planned or under construction

References

External links

 Sydney Metro official website

 
Sydney
Sydney, metro
Railway stations, Sydney
Lists of buildings and structures in Sydney